The second season of Señora Acero, an American television series produced by Argos Comunicación and Telemundo Studios, it premiered on 22 September 2015, and ended on 11 January 2016 with a total of seventy-five episodes. The season revolves around Sara Aguilar, who spent 5 years in prison, and who returns to take revenge on El Teca. The opening theme for this season is "La venganza de Sarita" (English: "Sarita's Revenge") performed by Los Tucanes de Tijuana.

This is the last season in which Blanca Soto appears as the main character. It premiered with the episode "Sara es condenad" which garnered a total of 2.43 million viewers, and concluded with the episode "El Teca mata a Sara" with a total of 2.65 million viewers.

Cast

Main 
 Blanca Soto as Sara Aguilar
 Litzy as Aracely Paniagua
 José Luis Reséndez as El Teca
 Lincoln Palomeque as Manuel Caicedo
 Alejandro Calva as Miguel Quintanilla
 Jorge Zárate as El Indio Amaro

Recurring 
 Luciana Silveyra as Berta Aguilar
 Valentina Acosta as Miriam Godoy
 Ana Lucía Domínguez as La Tuti
 Carla Hernández as Clarissa Aldama
 Aurora Gil as Josefina Aguilar
 Alberto Agnesi as Marcelo Dóriga
 Rodrigo Guirao as Mario Casas
 Mauricio Henao as José Ángel Godoy
 Michel Duval as Salvador Acero
 Isabel Burr as Begoña Juárez
 Rosario Zúñiga as Rosa Sánchez
 Diego Soldano as Pedro Juárez
 Francisco "Pakey" Vázquez as Christian Jiménez
 Astrid Hernández as Briceida Montero
 Mauricio Martínez as Javier Ferraro
 Andy Zuno as Plutarco
 Sergio Lozano as Joaquín Fernández
 Óscar Priego as El Gallo
 Claudio Roca as Álvaro Martínez
 Emmanuel Orenday as Horacio Quiróga
 Adrián Cue as El Tepo
 Quetzalli Bulnes as Alicia Requejo
 Roberto Wohlmuth as El Roscas

Episodes

References 

2015 American television seasons
2015 Mexican television seasons
2016 American television seasons
2016 Mexican television seasons